Karmyshevo (Qarmış) is a rural locality (a selo) and the administrative center of Karmyshevsky Selsoviet, Alsheyevsky District, Bashkortostan, Russia. The population was 651 as of 2010. There are 7 streets.

Geography 
Karmyshevo is located 6 km southeast of Rayevsky (the district's administrative centre) by road. Churayevo is the nearest rural locality.

References 

Rural localities in Alsheyevsky District